Cremastobombycia ignota is a moth of the family Gracillariidae. It is known from Illinois, Texas, Kentucky, Maine, New York, Massachusetts, Washington and Ohio in the United States.

The wingspan is 6.5-7.5 mm.

The larvae feed on Elephantopus species (including Elephantopus carolinianus), Helianthus species (including Helianthus annuus and Helianthus giganteus), Ridania alternifolia, Verbesina species (including Verbesina alternifolia and Verbesina virginica). They mine the leaves of their host plant. The mine has the form of a rather large tentiform mine on the underside of the leaf. The loosened epidermis becomes much wrinkled in the later stages, and the mine is distinctly visible on the upper surface as a tubercular swelling. The larva, which is pale in the earlier stages, becomes dark brown just before pupation. The dense white elongate cocoon, ornamented with longitudinal ridges, is suspended in the mine at each end by two silken threads.

References

External links
mothphotographersgroup
Cremastobombycia at microleps.org

Lithocolletinae

Moths of North America
Lepidoptera of the United States
Moths described in 1873
Taxa named by Heinrich Frey
Taxa named by Jacob Boll
Leaf miners